Whom Should We Shoot? (translit.`Alā mann Notlīq Ar-rasās, IPA [ʕælɑ: mʌn nʊtˤlq ərəsˤʌs]) is a 1975 Egyptian drama film directed by Kamal El Sheikh. The film was listed in the CIFF Top 100 Egyptian films and was also selected as the Egyptian entry for the Best Foreign Language Film at the 49th Academy Awards, but was not accepted as a nominée.

Cast
 Soad Hosny
 Mahmoud Yassine
 Gamil Ratib

See also
 Soad Hosny filmography
 List of Egyptian films of 1975
 List of Egyptian films of the 1970s
 List of submissions to the 49th Academy Awards for Best Foreign Language Film
 List of Egyptian submissions for the Academy Award for Best Foreign Language Film

References

External links
 

1975 films
1975 drama films
1970s Arabic-language films
Films directed by Kamal El Sheikh
Egyptian drama films